was a Japanese singer-songwriter and actor.

Career 

In 1969, Kawashima began singing folk songs as a student at Osaka Prefectural Hanazono High School in Higashiōsaka, Osaka Prefecture. After graduating, Kawashima was active in a group called Homo Sapiens and then debuted with the Kyoto indie record label Kyoto Record. His looks and vocal style led some to call him the second coming of Takuro Yoshida.

In 1973, Kawashima began his solo career and released his debut solo album Jinrui in 1975 . In 1976, Kawashima released his first hit single "Sake to Namida to Otoko to Onna" ("Drinks, Tears, a Man and a Woman"). Kawashima wrote "Sake to Namida to Otoko to Onna" at the age of 19, inspired by the figure of his uncle. The song became known nationwide after it was used in a TV commercial for Kizakura, a Kyoto brewery, and is considered one of his greatest hits. In 1984, Kawashima released the hit single "Nofuuzo", a cover of a 1980 song composed by Hiroyuki Yamamoto. The song title "Nofuuzo" is a word from the Chūgoku dialect of Japanese roughly meaning "rebellious" or "cheeky". In 1986, Kawashima released another hit single "Jidai Okure" ("Old-fashioned"), a song which saw numerous covers and remains a popular karaoke choice to this day among older men.

On 16 April 2001, Kawashima died of liver disease at a hospital in Higashiōsaka, a week before his 49th birthday. Kawashima was buried at a Shingon Buddhist temple in Nara.

Discography

Original albums 
 Jinrui – 1975
 Unmei – 1976 (Up until this point, albums were sold under "Eigo Kawashima and Homo Sapiens".)
 Shinbō – 1977
 Jinsei – 1978
 Collected Works of Eigo Kawashima – 1979
 Homo Sapiens Mongai Fu Shutsu – 1979
 Bunmei I – 1980
 Bunmei II – 1980
 Bunmei III – 1980
 Hakkan – 1985
 Jidai Okure – 1986
 Romantist – 1987
 Kisetsu – 1988
 Ikutsu Ka No Bamen – 1991

Live albums 
 Live Tenbin Bakari – 1975
 Eigo Kawashima Last Live ~ Kyou wa Hontou ni Arigato – 1975

Collaborations 
 Unagitani (鰻谷) – Aki Yashiro
 Sayonara Anta (さよならあんた) – Aki Yashiro
 Tsuki no Hanamatsuri (月の花まつり) – Aki Yashiro

References

External links 
 Eigo Kawashima Memorial Website 
 https://www2.nhk.or.jp/archives/jinbutsu/detail.cgi?das_id=D0009250171_00000 

1952 births
2001 deaths
Japanese-language singers
Japanese male singer-songwriters
Japanese singer-songwriters
Musicians from Osaka
20th-century Japanese male singers
20th-century Japanese singers